The Progress is a weekly newspaper that covers six towns in the western area of Essex County, New Jersey. The towns are Caldwell, North Caldwell, West Caldwell, Fairfield, Roseland and Essex Fells.
The newspaper was founded more than 100 years ago.
Weekly paid circulation was 3,905 as of May 2014.
The Progress is owned by New Jersey Hills Media Group, which bought the independent newspaper from co-owners John A. Sullivan III and Jean Conlon in 1998.
Conlon of West Caldwell started work at The Progress in 1969 and became co-owner in 1987.
Rita Annan-Brady of Caldwell was editor from 1998 to 2008, when she became lifestyles editor, retiring in 2019.
Russ Crespolini was editor from 2014 to 2018.
He was succeeded by the current editor, Kathy Shwiff.

References

External links 
 

Weekly newspapers published in the United States
Newspapers published in New Jersey
Essex County, New Jersey